Deroplatys philippinica, with the common name Philippines dead leaf mantis, is a species of dead leaf mantis.

It is endemic to the Philippines.

See also
 
 List of mantis genera and species

References

philippinica
Mantodea of Southeast Asia
Endemic fauna of the Philippines
Insects of the Philippines
Insects described in 1838